Scoloderus nigriceps is a species of orb weaver in the spider family Araneidae. It is found in the United States, Mexico, Bahama Islands, Cuba, and Jamaica.

References

Araneidae
Articles created by Qbugbot
Spiders described in 1895